The 2013–14 East Midlands Counties Football League season was the 6th in the history of East Midlands Counties Football League, a football competition in England.

League

The league featured 16 clubs from the previous season, along with three new clubs:
Arnold Town, demoted from the Northern Counties East League
Stapenhill, promoted from the Leicestershire Senior League
Sutton Town, promoted from the Central Midlands Football League

Also, Eliistown merged with Ibstock United to form Ellistown & Ibstock United.

League table

Results

References

External links
 East Midlands Counties Football League official site

2013–14
10